Bhishma is a 1996 Indian Hindi-language thriller action film directed by Jagdish A Sharma, starring Mithun Chakraborty, Harish kumar, Anjali Jathar, and Vani Viswanath. The film was released on 26 July 1996 under the banner of R.A.R. Movies.

Plot
Paro, her mother, and her brother, Natwar, find an unconscious man near their town. They bring him to their house and nurse him back to health, only to find out that he has the mind of a 12-year-old child. They name him Bhola. Years pass, and Paro falls in love with Bhola for rescuing her from a molester. Before they can get married, Bhola is viciously attacked and left for dead by Paro's molester, and is hospitalized. While in the hospital, Police Sub-Inspector Abhimanyu Verma discovers Bhola is not who he claims to be, but rather a homicidal maniac - named Bhishma - wanted for killing three policemen and is possibly masquerading as a 12-year-old child to hide from the police.

Cast
Mithun Chakraborty as Bhola / Inspector Bhishma
Vani Viswanath as Paro
Mohan Joshi as Rana Saheb
Harish as Sub-Inspector Abhimanyu Verma
Anjali Jathar as Priya Rana
Johnny Lever as Natwar
Kader Khan as Jaunpuri
Mukesh Rishi as Nagesh Rana
Upasana Singh as Bharti Verma
Avtar Gill as Pratap Rana
Arun Bakshi as Inspector Jagawar
Sulabha Deshpande as Paro's Mom
Dinesh Hingoo as Milavatram

Music
"Chahe Jaan Jaye Chahe Dil" - Udit Narayan, Kavita Krishnamurthy
"Kya Nahin Kiya" - Udit Narayan, Alka Yagnik
"Tere Bina Duniya" - Kumar Sanu
"Mere Seene Mein Dil" - Jolly Mukherjee, Meena Patel
"O Soni O Soni" - Udit Narayan
"Dil Jo Lagaye" - Udit Narayan, Kavita Krishnamurthy

Box office
The film was above average at the box office.

External links

References

1996 films
1990s Hindi-language films
Mithun's Dream Factory films
Films shot in Ooty
Films scored by Dilip Sen-Sameer Sen
Indian action thriller films